Appendix O to the FIA International Sporting Code defines the inspection and licensing process for auto racing circuits intending to host races sanctioned by the Fédération Internationale de l'Automobile (FIA), motorsport's governing body. The grades issued by the FIA are 1, 2, 3, 4 and 6, depending on the suitability of the circuit for different types and groups of cars, with 1 being the highest grade and the only circuits that can host Formula One races. A circuit holding a particular grade can also host events featuring categories of cars at lower grades. The grades are issued "with the sole purpose of permitting the registration of races on the FIA International Calendar, for the categories of vehicles specified".

Grades 1–4 concern various categories of cars depending on their power to weight ratio, and grade 6 relates to autocross, rallycross and ice racing courses. Grade 5 was previously designated for alternative energy vehicles until September 2022 when this was changed to designate developing circuits with FIA Provisional Circuit Licences.

Grade One
There are 39 Grade One circuit with 49 layouts. Circuits holding Grade One certification may host events involving "Automobiles of Groups D (FIA International Formula) and E (Free Formula) with a weight/power ratio of less than 1 kg/hp." As such, a Grade One certification is required to host events involving Formula One cars.

Grade Two
There are 60 Grade Two circuits for a total of 70 layouts as of February 2023. Circuits holding Grade Two certification may host events involving "Automobiles of Groups D (FIA International Formula) and E (Free formula) with a weight/power ratio of between 1 and 2 kg/hp."

If a circuit with a Grade 2 layout also has other layouts in other grade/s, will be shaded  on other grade lists.

Grade Three
There are 33 Grade Three circuits for a total of 40 layouts as of February 2023. Circuits holding Grade Three certification may host events involving "Category II Automobiles with a weight/power ratio of between 2 and 3 kg/hp. Since 2020, there is also a specific grade given for Formula E circuits; which is called as "Grade 3E"."

Grade Four
 there are 8 Grade Four circuits. Circuits holding Grade Four certification may host events involving "Category I Automobiles. Category II Automobiles with a weight/power ratio higher than 3 kg/hp."

Grade Six
 there are 15 Grade Six circuits. Grade Six is split into three parts: Grade 6A for all classes of Autocross vehicles, Grade 6R for all classes of Rallycross vehicles and Grade 6G for all classes of Ice Racing vehicles.

See also
 List of motor racing tracks

Notes

References

Circuits,FIA Grade
Motorsport venues by FIA Grade